Mikhail Yemelyanov (born 5 April 1991) is a Kazakhstani sprint canoer who competed in the late 2000s. At the 2008 Summer Olympics in Beijing, he was eliminated in the semifinals of both the C-1 500 m and the C-1 1000 m events.

External links
Sports-Reference.com profile
ICF profile

1991 births
Canoeists at the 2008 Summer Olympics
Kazakhstani male canoeists
Living people
Olympic canoeists of Kazakhstan
Asian Games medalists in canoeing
Canoeists at the 2010 Asian Games
Canoeists at the 2014 Asian Games
Asian Games gold medalists for Kazakhstan
Asian Games bronze medalists for Kazakhstan
Medalists at the 2010 Asian Games
Medalists at the 2014 Asian Games